Orthophytum zanonii is a plant species in the genus Orthophytum.

The bromeliad is endemic to the Atlantic Forest biome (Mata Atlantica Brasileira)  in Espírito Santo state, located in southeastern Brazil.

References

zanonii
Endemic flora of Brazil
Flora of Espírito Santo
Flora of the Atlantic Forest
Vulnerable flora of South America